En Bommukutty Ammavuku is a 1988 Indian Tamil-language drama film directed by Fazil, starring Sathyaraj, Suhasini, Raghuvaran, Rekha and Geetu Mohandas. It is a remake of Fazil's own Malayalam film Ente Mamattukkuttiyammakku (1983). The film was released on 15 April 1988.

Plot 

Lakshmi and Vinod, a couple who lost their daughter in an accident, decide to adopt a girl from the local orphanage. But problems arise when the child's biological parents Mercy and Alex seek to find her.

Cast 
 Sathyaraj as Vinod
 Suhasini as Lakshmi
 Raghuvaran as Alex
 Rekha as Mercy
 M. S. Thripunithura as Fr Joseph Epstein
 Janagaraj as Lawyer 
 Geetu Mohandas as Tinnu

Soundtrack 
The music was composed by Ilaiyaraaja.

Reception 
The Indian Express wrote, "The script moves ever so gracefully plumbing the depths of a bereaved couple's predicament." The reviewer went on to say, "Fazil seems to have given a great deal of thought to every scene. The only drawback of the film ironically contributed by music director Ilayaraja, whose brother Baskar is the film's producer. The one man who is allowed to indulge himself is Ilayaraja (too many songs). After all, it's as good as being his own film".

References

External links 
 

1980s Tamil-language films
1988 films
Films about adoption
Films directed by Fazil
Films scored by Ilaiyaraaja
Indian drama films
Tamil remakes of Malayalam films